Uraeotyphlus interruptus,  also known as the Chengalam caecilian, is a species of caecilian in the family Ichthyophiidae. It is endemic to the Western Ghats in southern India and is only known from its type locality, Chengalam village in Kerala.

Description
The body has 162 folds. The primary annuli cross the dorsum only on the posterior half and venter only in front of the vent. The collar region is slightly wider than the head; the two collars are completely fused dorsally but are distinct ventrally. The eyes are distinct. The ventral tentacle lies below the nostril. Colouration is slaty violet above, slightly lighter below. The body folds are marked by white lines that are more conspicuous on the posterior ventral one-third of the body.

Habitat and conservation
Uraeotyphlus interruptus  is a subterranean (fossorial) species associated with loose soil. It is probably oviparous with terrestrial eggs and aquatic larvae living in streams.

Specific threats to this species are unknown. However, it clearly is somewhat adaptable, and as such might not face significant threat from habitat change. It is not known to occur in any protected areas.

References

interruptus
Amphibians of India
Endemic fauna of the Western Ghats
Fauna of Kerala
Amphibians described in 1999